Ročica is a settlement in the Slovene Hills in northeastern Slovenia. It lies in the Municipality of Pesnica. The area is part of the traditional region of Styria. The entire Municipality of Pesnica is now included in the Drava Statistical Region.

References

External links
Ročica on Geopedia

Populated places in the Municipality of Pesnica